McDermitt is an unincorporated community straddling the Nevada–Oregon border, in Humboldt County, Nevada, and Malheur County, Oregon, United States. McDermitt's economy has historically been based on mining, ranching, and farming. The last mining operation closed in 1990, resulting in a steady decline in population.

As of the 2010 census, the combined population was 513. Seventy-five percent of the residents were American Indian, predominantly Northern Paiute of the Fort McDermitt Indian Reservation, whose members include Shoshone people.

History
The community, originally called Dugout, was named after Fort McDermit. It was named after Lt. Col. Charles McDermit, commander of the Military District of Nevada, who was killed by Indians in a skirmish in the area in 1865. It is not known why there is a discrepancy in the spelling. Fort McDermit, which was  outside the current township, was originally established to protect the stagecoach route from Virginia City through Winnemucca to Silver City, Idaho Territory. The stage road was the military's most important transportation route in southeast Oregon.  The township of Dugout was established as support for Fort McDermit.

Geography and climate

McDermitt is in the Oregon High Desert with a desert climate (Köppen climate classification BSk), averaging  of rain annually with hot, dry summers and cold winters. Most precipitation (47%) occurs from March through June. About 23% occurs from September through November, and 25% from December through February, much as snow.

The McDermitt area boasts the longest climatic record in Nevada, with data beginning in 1866. The earliest Nevada climate stations were at Army posts. The U.S. Army Signal Corps was responsible for weather duty in the late 19th century and established the National Weather Service in 1870.

Demographics

For statistical purposes, the census bureau has allocated McDermitt two census-designated places (CDPs), McDermitt, Nevada and Fort McDermitt, Nevada. The Oregon portion of McDermitt is not part of the McDermitt CDP, but is included in the Ontario, OR–ID Micropolitan Statistical Area.
Essentially the Fort McDermitt CDP entails the Fort McDermitt Indian Reservation and the McDermitt CDP entails the adjoining McDermitt township.

Fort McDermitt CDP 

As of the US census of 2010, there were 341 people, of which 30% were under the age of 18 years and 11% (39 people) over the age of 65 years. 92% (313 people) were American Indian, with 3.5% (12 people) described as being of two or more races, and 0.6% (two people) were White. There were 125 housing units with 86% (108) described as occupied. There were 108 males for every 100 females.

McDermitt CDP 

As of the US census of 2010, there were 172 people, of which 18% were under the age of 18 years and 22% (38 people) over the age of 65 years. 24% (42 people) were American Indian, with 0% described as being of two or more races, and 68% (117 people) were White. There were 101 housing units with 77% (78) described as occupied. There were 110 males for every 100 females.

Economy

McDermitt's economy has historically been based on mining, ranching and farming. In the period 1917 to 1989 it was home to four nationally significant mercury mines in the McDermitt CalderaBretz, Opalite, Cordero and McDermittwhich from 1933 to 1989 were the largest producers in North America. In 1985 of the 16,530 flasks of mercury (each containing  produced in the US, 16,337 came from the McDermitt Mine. The closure of mercury mining in 1990 resulted in a significant decline in population.

Current development activities that may result in renewed mining are at Cordero (gold and silver), Cordero (gallium), Buckskin-National (gold-silver), Aurora (uranium) and Disaster Peak (gold). The largest employers in McDermitt are the Say When Bar, Restaurant & Casino and the McDermitt Combined School.

Points of interest
The state line goes through the White Horse Inn, a historical landmark now being restored, which was a saloon, hotel, and (reportedly) brothel. When it was open, food could be ordered and paid for in Oregon, avoiding the Nevada state sales tax.

Education
Humboldt County School District operates the McDermitt Combined School, a kindergarten–twelfth grade (K–12) school, in the Nevada side.

The Oregon side is zoned to McDermitt School District 51, a school district, governed by a board of directors, which sends all of its students to McDermitt Combined in Nevada and which does not have any employees. Circa 2006, 16 students, of all grade levels, lived in the district. In 2006 the district possessed a school building that was no longer used.

The section of Malheur County in which McDermitt, Oregon is located in is not in any community college district.

McDermitt has a public library, a branch of the Humboldt County Library.

Transportation
McDermitt State Airport

See also
Fort McDermit
Denio, Nevada
Hatfield, California–Oregon

References

External links
 
 Historic images of McDermitt from Salem Public Library

Census-designated places in Humboldt County, Nevada
Census-designated places in Nevada
Divided cities
Ontario, Oregon micropolitan area
Unincorporated communities in Malheur County, Oregon
Unincorporated communities in Oregon
Unincorporated communities in Nevada